The 1998 Embassy World Professional Darts Championship was held from 3–11 January 1998 at the Lakeside Country Club in Frimley Green, Surrey.

It saw Dutchman Raymond van Barneveld, the number one seed, win the first of four BDO world titles (and five overall), avenging his defeat by Richie Burnett in the 1995 final by beating him in a thrilling decider which went to the final set and a tiebreak.  Barneveld became the first top seed to win the Embassy world title since his future rival Phil Taylor in 1992, and the second champion from outside the United Kingdom after John Part in 1994.

Defending champion Les Wallace lost in the second round to 1996 champion Steve Beaton.

Seeds
  Raymond van Barneveld
  Ronnie Baxter
  Roland Scholten
  Martin Adams
  Mervyn King
  Sean Palfrey
  Marshall James
  Les Wallace

Prize money
The prize money was £160,400.

Champion: £40,000
Runner-Up: £20,000
Semi-Finalists (2): £9,000
Quarter-Finalists (4): £4,600
Last 16 (8): £3,500
Last 32 (16): £2,250

There was also a 9 Dart Checkout prize of £52,000, along with a High Checkout prize of £1,600.

Bracket

References

BDO World Darts Championships
BDO World Darts Championship
BDO World Darts Championship
BDO World Darts Championship
Sport in Surrey
Frimley Green